BJPsych Bulletin is a bimonthly peer-reviewed open access medical journal covering psychiatry, especially issues relevant to the clinical practice of psychiatrists. It was established in 1977 as the Bulletin of the Royal College of Psychiatrists, and it was renamed the Psychiatric Bulletin in 1988. In 2010, it was renamed The Psychiatrist, and was published as The Psychiatric Bulletin during 2014 before acquiring its current title in 2015. It is published by Cambridge University Press on behalf of the Royal College of Psychiatrists, which owns the journal. The editor-in-chief is Norman Poole (South West London and St George's Mental Health NHS Trust).

The journal is abstracted or indexed in
EMBASE
PubMed Central
Emerging Sources Citation Index
Scopus
PsycINFO
Directory of Open Access Journals (DOAJ)

References

External links

Open access journals
Cambridge University Press academic journals
Publications established in 1977
English-language journals
Psychiatry journals